HMS Immortalité was one of seven  armoured cruisers built for the Royal Navy in the mid-1880s. She was sold for scrap on 11 January 1907.

Design and description

The ship's complement was 484 officers and ratings.

Immortalités main armament consisted of two breech-loading (BL)  Mk V guns, one gun fore and aft of the superstructure on pivot mounts. Her secondary armament was ten BL  guns, five on each broadside. Protection against torpedo boats was provided by six quick-firing (QF) 6-pounder Hotchkiss guns and ten QF 3-pounder Hotchkiss guns, most of which were mounted on the main deck in broadside positions. The ship was also armed with six 18-inch (457 mm) torpedo tubes: four on the broadside above water and one each in the bow and stern below water.

The ends of the armour belt were closed off by transverse bulkheads .

Construction and service

Immortalité, named for the French frigate Immortalité captured in 1798, was laid down on 18 January 1886 by Chatham Royal Dockyard. The ship was launched on 7 June 1887, and completed in July 1889.

In March 1900 she had successful machinery trials in the North Sea, and was transferred to the A division of the Medway Fleet Reserve.
She was commissioned at Chatham on 21 May 1901 by Captain Sackville Carden as seagoing tender to the Wildfire, flagship at Sheerness. She took part in the fleet review held at Spithead on 16 August 1902 for the coronation of King Edward VII, and two months later Captain Archibald Peile Stoddart succeeded Carden in command on 16 October 1902.

Notes

References

External links

 

Orlando-class cruisers
Ships built in Chatham
1887 ships